U.S. Città di Palermo played the 2009–10 season in Serie A, the sixth consecutive season for the Sicilian club in the Italian top flight since their return to the league in 2004.

Season overview

On May 30, 2009, hours before the final Serie A 2008–09 league game against Sampdoria, Palermo head coach Davide Ballardini announced he was taking a 10-day pause in order to decide with his future with the club. Later that day, Palermo chairman Maurizio Zamparini announced Ballardini had asked to be relieved from his position due to his unwillingness to keep on serving as Palermo head coach. This led Zamparini to start searching for a new head coach: successively, on June 5, Palermo announced they had finished their search for a new boss by appointing outgoing Catania manager Walter Zenga. The choice was not appreciated by a large part of the Palermo fanbase, who rejected the idea of appointing the head coach who had just guided Sicilian rivals Catania in the previous season, also leading his side to an astonishing 4–0 win at Palermo, the biggest one for Catania against their rosanero rivals. Successively, Zamparini motivated the appointment of Zenga by saying he wanted a manager he regarded as fit to fulfil his own personal ambitions of a UEFA Champions League spot for the new season.

Since then, Zamparini started working on improving the current roster by a number of additions. Mirko Savini and Alberto Fontana's expiring contracts were not renewed, whereas Genoa applied an option to buy one half of Boško Janković rights, something that Sampdoria did not do on Andrea Raggi. The club was successively linked with Argentine players Nicolás Bertolo, Gabriel Paletta and Javier Pastore. Bertolo then announced on June 17 he had already agreed a permanent deal with Palermo which was set to be finalized later on July due to his ongoing involvement in the Clausura tournament. On June 25, Zamparini announced he had also completed the signing of Javier Pastore, dubbed by him as "the new Kaká", stating the move will being officially announced at the end of the Clausura tournament; this was however successively denied by the player's agent. On July 11, Palermo announced on its official website to have completed the signing of Pastore.

Several other outgoing moves involved youngsters from the Under-19 squad who had just won the Trofeo Giacinto Facchetti: Samuele Romeo was loaned to Lumezzane, Gianvito Misuraca was sold to Vicenza in a co-ownership bid (as part of a deal from Palermo in order to buy Nicola Rigoni from the biancorossi starting from the 2010–11 season), midfielder Salvatore Temperino to Rimini and goalkeeper Giuseppe Ingrassia loaned to Verona. Also, on July 3 Hernán Dellafiore returned from relegated Torino only to be loaned out again, this time to Parma. On July 7 Palermo announced to have loaned out midfielder Roberto Guana to Bologna. On August 5, an exchange bid with Genoa was finalized, with first choice keeper Marco Amelia being transferred with the rossoblu club, and Rubinho joining the Sicilian side. On August 7 Palermo also finalized the signing of Romanian international Dorin Goian from Steaua. On August 10 young full-back Antonio Mazzotta, who had joined the first team during the pre-season phase, was then loaned out to Serie B outfit Lecce in order to gain some first team experience.

Zenga made his first press conference as Palermo boss on July 8 in Udine, in the eve of the start of the pre-season phase in the training camps of Sankt Veit and Bad Kleinkirchheim, Austria. In his first official appearances as new rosanero boss, Zenga surprised the press by declaring he wants to guide Palermo into winning the Serie A 2009–10 title. Palermo made their debut in front of its fans for a friendly tournament called Win Win Palermo and held at Stadio Renzo Barbera, against La Liga clubs RCD Mallorca and Sevilla FC, composed by three games of 45 minutes each; Palermo defeated Sevilla 1–0 in the first game, but then lost the following to Mallorca (who eventually won the tournament) in a 2–0 result. The rosanero side made their competitive debut on August 15, in a third round 2009–10 Coppa Italia single-legged home game against Lega Pro Prima Divisione club SPAL 1907, which they won 4–2.

After an unimpressive start of season, with Palermo lying in twelfth place, on November 23, 2009 Palermo chairman Maurizio Zamparini announced to have dismissed Walter Zenga from the head coaching role; this followed a 1–1 home draw in the Derby di Sicilia against Catania which was received with massive disappointment by the rosanero supporters. He was replaced by former Lazio boss Delio Rossi.

Under the tenure of Delio Rossi, Palermo enjoyed a considerable improvement in results, achieving 17 points in his first eight games in charge, and seven consecutive league games without a defeat. These results also included a shock 2–0 win at Stadio San Siro against A.C. Milan, and a 3–0 clear home win against UEFA Champions League competitors ACF Fiorentina. On the other hand, Palermo's run in the Coppa Italia was already halted at the round of 16 by incumbent champions Lazio.

Another historic victory came on February 28, as Palermo cruised to defeat Juventus again also in the return leg in Turin, with a 2–0 result provided by goals from Fabrizio Miccoli and Igor Budan. Such victory led Palermo up to fourth place, the last remaining spot to qualify for the 2010–11 UEFA Champions League. This prestigious victory was then followed by a record seventh consecutive home win in a game against Livorno, ended 1–0. Palermo lost the fourth place to Sampdoria in the final games of the season, after losing 2–0 the Sicilian derby to Catania, and only achieving a 2–2 draw at Cagliari and a 1–1 home draw to Sampdoria itself; in the latter game, team captain Fabrizio Miccoli got seriously injured in action with broken knee ligaments after a challenge that led to a penalty scored by Miccoli himself. Palermo ended the season in fifth place, completing the season with an injury-time 2–1 win to Atalanta.

Palermo will also have a number of players featuring in the 2010 FIFA World Cup: Javier Pastore with Argentina, Simon Kjær with Denmark, Edinson Cavani with Uruguay and out-of-contract Mark Bresciano with Australia. Two other players, Salvatore Sirigu and Mattia Cassani, were originally selected by Marcello Lippi to be part of a 28-player preliminary squad for Italy, but they did not make into the 23-player definitive squad in the end.

Confirmed summer transfer market bids
In

Out

Out on loan

Transfers

In

Out

Out on loan

Players

Squad information
As of May 31, 2010

|-
|colspan="12"|Players sold or loaned out during the winter transfer market:

|}

Competitions

Serie A

League table

Matches

Coppa Italia

References

Palermo F.C. seasons
Palermo